Melese Nberet (born 29 January 2001) is an Ethiopian middle-distance runner. He competed in the 800 metres at the 2020 Summer Olympics, where he was eliminated in round 1, running a time of 1:47.80.

References

Living people
2001 births
Ethiopian male middle-distance runners
Olympic athletes of Ethiopia
Athletes (track and field) at the 2020 Summer Olympics
Athletes (track and field) at the 2018 Summer Youth Olympics
Athletes (track and field) at the 2018 African Youth Games
21st-century Ethiopian people